In number theory, a Wieferich prime is a prime number p such that p2 divides , therefore connecting these primes with Fermat's little theorem, which states that every odd prime p divides . Wieferich primes were first described by Arthur Wieferich in 1909 in works pertaining to Fermat's Last Theorem, at which time both of Fermat's theorems were already well known to mathematicians.

Since then, connections between Wieferich primes and various other topics in mathematics have been discovered, including other types of numbers and primes, such as Mersenne and Fermat numbers, specific types of pseudoprimes and some types of numbers generalized from the original definition of a Wieferich prime. Over time, those connections discovered have extended to cover more properties of certain prime numbers as well as more general subjects such as number fields and the abc conjecture.

, the only known Wieferich primes are 1093 and 3511 .

Equivalent definitions 

The stronger version of Fermat's little theorem, which a Wieferich prime satisfies, is usually expressed as a congruence relation . From the definition of the congruence relation on integers, it follows that this property is equivalent to the definition given at the beginning. Thus if a prime p satisfies this congruence, this prime divides the Fermat quotient . The following are two illustrative examples using the primes 11 and 1093:
 For p = 11, we get  which is 93 and leaves a remainder of 5 after division by 11, hence 11 is not a Wieferich prime. For p = 1093, we get  or 485439490310...852893958515 (302 intermediate digits omitted for clarity), which leaves a remainder of 0 after division by 1093 and thus 1093 is a Wieferich prime.

Wieferich primes can be defined by other equivalent congruences. If p is a Wieferich prime, one can multiply both sides of the congruence  by 2 to get . Raising both sides of the congruence to the power p shows that a Wieferich prime also satisfies , and hence  for all . The converse is also true:  for some  implies that the multiplicative order of 2 modulo p2 divides gcd, φ, that is,  and thus p is a Wieferich prime. This also implies that Wieferich primes can be defined as primes p such that the multiplicative orders of 2 modulo p and modulo p2 coincide: , (By the way, ord10932 = 364, and ord35112 = 1755).

H. S. Vandiver proved that  if and only if .

History and search status 

In 1902, Meyer proved a theorem about solutions of the congruence ap − 1 ≡ 1 (mod pr). Later in that decade Arthur Wieferich showed specifically that if the first case of Fermat's last theorem has solutions for an odd prime exponent, then that prime must satisfy that congruence for a = 2 and r = 2. In other words, if there exist solutions to xp + yp + zp = 0 in integers x, y, z and p an odd prime with p ∤ xyz, then p satisfies 2p − 1 ≡ 1 (mod p2). He asked the question when this residue vanishes and tried to find expressions for answering this question.

Inspired by an earlier work of Euler, he simplified Meissner's proof by showing that 10932 | (2182 + 1) and remarked that (2182 + 1) is a factor of (2364 − 1). It was also shown that it is possible to prove that 1093 is a Wieferich prime without using complex numbers contrary to the method used by Meissner, although Meissner himself hinted at that he was aware of a proof without complex values.

The prime 3511 was first found to be a Wieferich prime by N. G. W. H. Beeger in 1922 and another proof of it being a Wieferich prime was published in 1965 by Guy. Around 1980, Lehmer was able to reach the search limit of 6. This limit was extended to over 2.5 in 2006, finally reaching 3. It is now known that if any other Wieferich primes exist, they must be greater than 6.7.

In 2007–2016, a search for Wieferich primes was performed by the distributed computing project Wieferich@Home. In 2011–2017, another search was performed by the PrimeGrid project, although later the work done in this project was claimed wasted. While these projects reached search bounds above 1, neither of them reported any sustainable results.

In 2020, PrimeGrid started another project that searches for Wieferich and Wall–Sun–Sun primes simultaneously. The new project uses checksums to enable independent double-checking of each subinterval, thus minimizing the risk of missing an instance because of faulty hardware. The project ended in December 2022, definitely proving that a third Wieferich prime must exceed 264 (about 18).

It has been conjectured (as for Wilson primes) that infinitely many Wieferich primes exist, and that the number of Wieferich primes below x is approximately log(log(x)), which is a heuristic result that follows from the plausible assumption that for a prime p, the  degree roots of unity modulo p2 are uniformly distributed in the multiplicative group of integers modulo p2.

Properties

Connection with Fermat's Last Theorem 

The following theorem connecting Wieferich primes and Fermat's Last Theorem was proven by Wieferich in 1909:

Let p be prime, and let x, y, z be integers such that . Furthermore, assume that p does not divide the product xyz. Then p is a Wieferich prime.

The above case (where p does not divide any of x, y or z) is commonly known as the first case of Fermat's Last Theorem (FLTI) and FLTI is said to fail for a prime p, if solutions to the Fermat equation exist for that p, otherwise FLTI holds for p.
In 1910, Mirimanoff expanded the theorem by showing that, if the preconditions of the theorem hold true for some prime p, then p2 must also divide . Granville and Monagan further proved that p2 must actually divide  for every prime m ≤ 89. Suzuki extended the proof to all primes m ≤ 113.

Let Hp be a set of pairs of integers with 1 as their greatest common divisor, p being prime to x, y and x + y, (x + y)p−1 ≡ 1 (mod p2),  (x + ξy) being the pth power of an ideal of K with ξ defined as cos 2π/p + i sin 2π/p. K = Q(ξ) is the field extension obtained by adjoining all polynomials in the algebraic number ξ to the field of rational numbers (such an extension is known as a number field or in this particular case, where ξ is a root of unity, a cyclotomic number field).
From uniqueness of factorization of ideals in Q(ξ) it follows that if the first case of Fermat's last theorem has solutions x, y, z then p divides x+y+z and (x, y), (y, z) and (z, x) are elements of Hp.
Granville and Monagan showed that (1, 1) ∈ Hp if and only if p is a Wieferich prime.

Connection with the abc conjecture and non-Wieferich primes 

A non-Wieferich prime is a prime p satisfying . J. H. Silverman showed in 1988 that if the abc conjecture holds, then there exist infinitely many non-Wieferich primes. More precisely he showed that the abc conjecture implies the existence of a constant only depending on α such that the number of non-Wieferich primes to base α with p less than or equal to a variable X is greater than log(X) as X goes to infinity. Numerical evidence suggests that very few of the prime numbers in a given interval are Wieferich primes. The set of Wieferich primes and the set of non-Wieferich primes, sometimes denoted by W2 and W2c respectively, are complementary sets, so if one of them is shown to be finite, the other one would necessarily have to be infinite, because both are proper subsets of the set of prime numbers. It was later shown that the existence of infinitely many non-Wieferich primes already follows from a weaker version of the abc conjecture, called the ABC-(k, ε) conjecture.

Connection with Mersenne and Fermat primes 

It is known that the nth Mersenne number  is prime only if n is prime. Fermat's little theorem implies that if  is prime, then Mp−1  is always divisible by p. Since Mersenne numbers of prime indices  Mp and Mq are co-prime,
A prime divisor p of Mq, where q is prime, is a Wieferich prime if and only if p2 divides Mq.
Thus, a Mersenne prime cannot also be a Wieferich prime. A notable open problem is to determine whether or not all Mersenne numbers of prime index are square-free. If q is prime and the Mersenne number Mq is not square-free, that is, there exists a prime p for which p2 divides Mq, then p is a Wieferich prime. Therefore, if there are only finitely many Wieferich primes, then there will be at most finitely many Mersenne numbers with prime index that are not square-free. Rotkiewicz showed a related result: if there are infinitely many square-free Mersenne numbers, then there are infinitely many non-Wieferich primes.

Similarly, if p is prime and p2 divides some Fermat number Fn , then p must be a Wieferich prime.

In fact, there exists a natural number n and a prime p that p2 divides  (where  is the n-th cyclotomic polynomial) if and only if p is a Wieferich prime. For example, 10932 divides , 35112 divides . (Any odd prime p divides only one  and n divides , and if and only if the period length of 1/p in binary is n, then p divides . Besides, if and only if p is a Wieferich prime, then the period length of 1/p and 1/p2 are the same (in binary). Otherwise, this is p times than that.)

For the primes 1093 and 3511, it was shown that neither of them is a divisor of any Mersenne number with prime index nor a divisor of any Fermat number, because 364 and 1755 are neither prime nor powers of 2.

Connection with other equations 

Scott and Styer showed that the equation px – 2y = d has at most one solution in positive integers (x, y), unless when p4 | 2ordp 2 – 1 if p ≢ 65 (mod 192) or unconditionally when p2 | 2ordp 2 – 1, where ordp 2 denotes the multiplicative order of 2 modulo p. They also showed that a solution to the equation ±ax1 ± 2y1 = ±ax2 ± 2y2 = c must be from a specific set of equations but that this does not hold, if a is a Wieferich prime greater than 1.25 x 1015.

Binary periodicity of p − 1 

Johnson observed that the two known Wieferich primes are one greater than numbers with periodic binary expansions (1092 = 0100010001002=44416; 3510 = 1101101101102=66668). The Wieferich@Home project searched for Wieferich primes by testing numbers that are one greater than a number with a periodic binary expansion, but up to a "bit pseudo-length" of 3500 of the tested binary numbers generated by combination of bit strings with a bit length of up to 24 it has not found a new Wieferich prime.

Abundancy of p − 1 

It has been noted  that the known Wieferich primes are one greater than mutually friendly numbers (the shared abundancy index being 112/39).

Connection with pseudoprimes 

It was observed that the two known Wieferich primes are the square factors of all non-square free base-2 Fermat pseudoprimes up to 25. Later computations showed that the only repeated factors of the pseudoprimes up to 1012 are 1093 and 3511. In addition, the following connection exists:
Let n be a base 2 pseudoprime and p be a prime divisor of n. If , then also . Furthermore, if p is a Wieferich prime, then p2 is a Catalan pseudoprime.

Connection with directed graphs 

Here the doubling diagram represents the directed graph with the non-negative integers less than m as vertices and with directed edges going from each vertex x to vertex 2x reduced modulo m.

Properties related to number fields 

Furthermore, the following was shown: Let p be a Wieferich prime. If , let  be the fundamental discriminant of the imaginary quadratic field  and if , let  be the fundamental discriminant of the imaginary quadratic field .

Assume that q divides h+, the class number of the real cyclotomic field , the cyclotomic field obtained by adjoining the sum of a p-th root of unity and its reciprocal to the field of rational numbers. Then q is a Wieferich prime.

Generalizations

Near-Wieferich primes 
A prime p satisfying the congruence 2(p−1)/2  (mod p2) with small |A| is commonly called a near-Wieferich prime . Near-Wieferich primes with A = 0 represent Wieferich primes. Recent searches, in addition to their primary search for Wieferich primes, also tried to find near-Wieferich primes. The following table lists all near-Wieferich primes with |A| ≤ 10 in the interval [1, 3]. This search bound was reached in 2006 in a search effort by P. Carlisle, R. Crandall and M. Rodenkirch. Bigger entries are by PrimeGrid.

The sign +1 or -1 above can be easily predicted by Euler's criterion (and the second supplement to the law of quadratic reciprocity).

Dorais and Klyve used a different definition of a near-Wieferich prime, defining it as a prime p with small value of  where  is the Fermat quotient of 2 with respect to p modulo p (the modulo operation here gives the residue with the smallest absolute value).

The two notions of nearness are related as follows. If , then by squaring, clearly . So if  had been chosen with  small, then clearly  is also (quite) small, and an even number. However, when  is odd above, the related  from before the last squaring was not "small".

Base-a Wieferich primes 

A Wieferich prime base a is a prime p that satisfies
 , with a less than p but greater than 1.
Such a prime cannot divide a, since then it would also divide 1.

It's a conjecture that for every natural number a, there are infinitely many Wieferich primes in base a.

It was shown that  if and only if .

{| class="wikitable"
|-
! a
! primes p such that ap − 1 = 1 (mod p2)
! OEIS sequence
|-
| 1 || 2, 3, 5, 7, 11, 13, 17, 19, 23, 29, ... (All primes)
| 
|-
| 2 || 1093, 3511, ...
| 
|-
| 3 || 11, 1006003, ...
| 
|-
| 4 || 1093, 3511, ...
|
|-
| 5 || 2, 20771, 40487, 53471161, 1645333507, 6692367337, 188748146801, ...
| 
|-
| 6 || 66161, 534851, 3152573, ...
| 
|-
| 7 || 5, 491531, ...
| 
|-
| 8 || 3, 1093, 3511, ...
|
|-
| 9 || 2, 11, 1006003, ...
|
|-
| 10 || 3, 487, 56598313, ...
| 
|-
| 11 || 71, ...
|
|-
| 12 || 2693, 123653, ...
| 
|-
| 13 || 2, 863, 1747591, ...
| 
|-
| 14 || 29, 353, 7596952219, ...
| 
|-
| 15 || 29131, 119327070011, ...
| 
|-
| 16 || 1093, 3511, ...
|
|-
| 17 || 2, 3, 46021, 48947, 478225523351, ...
| 
|-
| 18 || 5, 7, 37, 331, 33923, 1284043, ...
| 
|-
| 19 || 3, 7, 13, 43, 137, 63061489, ...
| 
|-
| 20 || 281, 46457, 9377747, 122959073, ...
| 
|-
| 21 || 2, ...
|
|-
| 22 || 13, 673, 1595813, 492366587, 9809862296159, ...
| 
|-
| 23 || 13, 2481757, 13703077, 15546404183, 2549536629329, ...
| 
|-
| 24 || 5, 25633, ...
|
|-
| 25 || 2, 20771, 40487, 53471161, 1645333507, 6692367337, 188748146801, ...
|
|-
| 26 || 3, 5, 71, 486999673, 6695256707, ...
| 
|-
| 27 || 11, 1006003, ...
|
|-
| 28 || 3, 19, 23, ...
|
|-
| 29 || 2, ...
|
|-
| 30 || 7, 160541, 94727075783, ...
| 
|-
| 31 || 7, 79, 6451, 2806861, ...
| 
|-
| 32 || 5, 1093, 3511, ...
|
|-
| 33 || 2, 233, 47441, 9639595369, ...
|
|-
| 34 || 46145917691, ...
|
|-
| 35 || 3, 1613, 3571, ...
|
|-
| 36 || 66161, 534851, 3152573, ...
|
|-
| 37 || 2, 3, 77867, 76407520781, ...
| 
|-
| 38 || 17, 127, ...
|
|-
| 39 || 8039, ...
|
|-
| 40 || 11, 17, 307, 66431, 7036306088681, ...
|
|-
| 41 || 2, 29, 1025273, 138200401, ...
| 
|-
| 42 || 23, 719867822369, ...
|
|-
| 43 || 5, 103, 13368932516573, ...
|
|-
| 44 || 3, 229, 5851, ...
|
|-
| 45 || 2, 1283, 131759, 157635607, ...
|
|-
| 46 || 3, 829, ...
|
|-
| 47 || ...
|
|-
| 48 || 7, 257, ...
|
|-
| 49 || 2, 5, 491531, ...
|
|-
| 50 || 7, ...
|
|}

For more information, see and. (Note that the solutions to a = bk is the union of the prime divisors of k which does not divide b and the solutions to a = b)

2, 1093, 11, 1093, 2, 66161, 5, 3, 2, 3, 71, 2693, 2, 29, 29131, 1093, 2, 5, 3, 281, 2, 13, 13, 5, 2, 3, 11, 3, 2, 7, 7, 5, 2, 46145917691, 3, 66161, 2, 17, 8039, 11, 2, 23, 5, 3, 2, 3, ... (The next term > 4.9×1013) 

The bases b < p2 which p is a Wieferich prime are (for b > p2, the solutions are just shifted by k·p2 for k > 0), and there are  solutions < p2 of p and the set of the solutions congruent to p are {1, 2, 3, ...,  

 {|class="wikitable"
|-
!p
!values of b < p2
|-
|2
|1
|-
|3
|1, 8
|-
|5
|1, 7, 18, 24
|-
|7
|1, 18, 19, 30, 31, 48
|-
|11
|1, 3, 9, 27, 40, 81, 94, 112, 118, 120
|-
|13
|1, 19, 22, 23, 70, 80, 89, 99, 146, 147, 150, 168
|-
|17
|1, 38, 40, 65, 75, 110, 131, 134, 155, 158, 179, 214, 224, 249, 251, 288
|-
|19
|1, 28, 54, 62, 68, 69, 99, 116, 127, 234, 245, 262, 292, 293, 299, 307, 333, 360
|-
|23
|1, 28, 42, 63, 118, 130, 170, 177, 195, 255, 263, 266, 274, 334, 352, 359, 399, 411, 466, 487, 501, 528
|-
|29
|1, 14, 41, 60, 63, 137, 190, 196, 221, 236, 267, 270, 374, 416, 425, 467, 571, 574, 605, 620, 645, 651, 704, 778, 781, 800, 827, 840
|}

The least base b > 1 which prime(n) is a Wieferich prime are
5, 8, 7, 18, 3, 19, 38, 28, 28, 14, 115, 18, 51, 19, 53, 338, 53, 264, 143, 11, 306, 31, 99, 184, 53, 181, 43, 164, 96, 68, 38, 58, 19, 328, 313, 78, 226, 65, 253, 259, 532, 78, 176, 276, 143, 174, 165, 69, 330, 44, 33, 332, 94, 263, 48, 79, 171, 747, 731, 20, ... 

It's a conjecture that for every natural number a, there are infinitely many primes such that .

Known solutions for small a are: (checked up to 4 × 1011) 

 {|class="wikitable"
!
!primes  such that 
|-
|1
|1093, 3511, ...
|-
|2
|23, 3842760169, 41975417117, ...
|-
|3
|5, 250829, ...
|-
|4
|3, 67, ...
|-
|5
|3457, 893122907, ...
|-
|6
|72673, 1108905403, 2375385997, ...
|-
|7
|13, 819381943, ...
|-
|8
|67, 139, 499, 26325777341, ...
|-
|9
|67, 887, 9257, 83449, 111539, 31832131, ...
|-
|10
|...
|-
|11
|107, 4637, 239357, ...
|-
|12
|5, 11, 51563, 363901, 224189011, ...
|-
|13
|3, ...
|-
|14
|11, 5749, 17733170113, 140328785783, ...
|-
|15
|292381, ...
|-
|16
|4157, ...
|-
|17
|751, 46070159, ...
|-
|18
|7, 142671309349, ...
|-
|19
|17, 269, ...
|-
|20
|29, 162703, ...
|-
|21
|5, 2711, 104651, 112922981, 331325567, 13315963127, ...
|-
|22
|3, 7, 13, 94447, 1198427, 23536243, ...
|-
|23
|43, 179, 1637, 69073, ...
|-
|24
|7, 353, 402153391, ...
|-
|25
|43, 5399, 21107, 35879, ...
|-
|26
|7, 131, 653, 5237, 97003, ...
|-
|27
|2437, 1704732131, ...
|-
|28
|5, 617, 677, 2273, 16243697, ...
|-
|29
|73, 101, 6217, ...
|-
|30
|7, 11, 23, 3301, 48589, 549667, ...
|-
|31
|3, 41, 416797, ...
|-
|32
|95989, 2276682269, ...
|-
|33
|139, 1341678275933, ...
|-
|34
|83, 139, ...
|-
|35
|...
|-
|36
|107, 137, 613, 2423, 74304856177, ...
|-
|37
|5, ...
|-
|38
|167, 2039, ...
|-
|39
|659, 9413, ...
|-
|40
|3, 23, 21029249, ...
|-
|41
|31, 71, 1934399021, 474528373843, ...
|-
|42
|4639, 1672609, ...
|-
|43
|31, 4962186419, ...
|-
|44
|36677, 17786501, ...
|-
|45
|241, 26120375473, ...
|-
|46
|5, 13877, ...
|-
|47
|13, 311, 797, 906165497, ...
|-
|48
|...
|-
|49
|3, 13, 2141, 281833, 1703287, 4805298913, ...
|-
|50
|2953, 22409, 99241, 5427425917, ...
|}

Wieferich pairs 

A Wieferich pair is a pair of primes p and q that satisfy
 pq − 1 ≡ 1 (mod q2) and qp − 1 ≡ 1 (mod p2)
There are only 7 known Wieferich pairs.

 (2, 1093), (3, 1006003), (5, 1645333507), (5, 188748146801), (83, 4871), (911, 318917), and (2903, 18787) (sequence  in OEIS)

Wieferich sequence 

Start with a(1) any natural number (>1), a(n) = the smallest prime p such that (a(n − 1))p − 1 = 1 (mod p2) but p2 does not divide a(n − 1) − 1 or a(n − 1) + 1. (If p2 divides a(n − 1) − 1 or a(n − 1) + 1, then the solution is a trivial solution) It is a conjecture that every natural number k = a(1) > 1 makes this sequence become periodic, for example, let a(1) = 2: 

2, 1093, 5, 20771, 18043, 5, 20771, 18043, 5, ..., it gets a cycle: {5, 20771, 18043}.

Let a(1) = 83: 

83, 4871, 83, 4871, 83, 4871, 83, ..., it gets a cycle: {83, 4871}.

Let a(1) = 59 (a longer sequence):

59, 2777, 133287067, 13, 863, 7, 5, 20771, 18043, 5, ..., it also gets 5.

However, there are many values of a(1) with unknown status, for example, let a(1) = 3:

3, 11, 71, 47, ? (There are no known Wieferich primes in base 47).

Let a(1) = 14:

14, 29, ? (There are no known Wieferich prime in base 29 except 2, but 22 = 4 divides 29 − 1 = 28)

Let a(1) = 39 (a longer sequence):
39, 8039, 617, 101, 1050139, 29, ? (It also gets 29)

It is unknown that values for a(1) > 1 exist such that the resulting sequence does not eventually become periodic.

When a(n − 1)=k, a(n) will be (start with k = 2): 1093, 11, 1093, 20771, 66161, 5, 1093, 11, 487, 71, 2693, 863, 29, 29131, 1093, 46021, 5, 7, 281, ?, 13, 13, 25633, 20771, 71, 11, 19, ?, 7, 7, 5, 233, 46145917691, 1613, 66161, 77867, 17, 8039, 11, 29, 23, 5, 229, 1283, 829, ?, 257, 491531, ?, ... (For k = 21, 29, 47, 50, even the next value is unknown)

Wieferich numbers 
A Wieferich number is an odd natural number n satisfying the congruence 2(n) ≡ 1 (mod n2), where  denotes the Euler's totient function (according to Euler's theorem, 2(n) ≡ 1 (mod n) for every odd natural number n). If Wieferich number n is prime, then it is a Wieferich prime. The first few Wieferich numbers are:
1, 1093, 3279, 3511, 7651, 10533, 14209, 17555, 22953, 31599, 42627, 45643, 52665, 68859, 94797, 99463, ... 
It can be shown that if there are only finitely many Wieferich primes, then there are only finitely many Wieferich numbers. In particular, if the only Wieferich primes are 1093 and 3511, then there exist exactly 104 Wieferich numbers, which matches the number of Wieferich numbers currently known.

More generally, a natural number n is a Wieferich number to base a, if a(n) ≡ 1 (mod n2).

The first of these numbers are:
21, 39, 55, 57, 105, 111, 147, 155, 165, 171, 183, 195, 201, 203, 205, 219, 231, 237, 253, 273, 285, 291, 301, 305, 309, 327, 333, 355, 357, 385, 399, ... 
As above, if Wieferich number q is prime, then it is a Wieferich prime.

Weak Wieferich prime 
A weak Wieferich prime to base a is a prime p satisfies the condition
ap ≡ a (mod p2)

Every Wieferich prime to base a is also a weak Wieferich prime to base a. If the base a is squarefree, then a prime p is a weak Wieferich prime to base a if and only if p is a Wieferich prime to base a.

Smallest weak Wieferich prime to base n are (start with n = 0)
2, 2, 1093, 11, 2, 2, 66161, 5, 2, 2, 3, 71, 2, 2, 29, 29131, 2, 2, 3, 3, 2, 2, 13, 13, 2, 2, 3, 3, 2, 2, 7, 7, 2, 2, 46145917691, 3, 2, 2, 17, 8039, 2, 2, 23, 5, 2, 2, 3, ...

Wieferich prime with order n 
For integer n ≥2, a Wieferich prime to base a with order n is a prime p satisfies the condition
ap−1 ≡ 1 (mod pn)

Clearly, a Wieferich prime to base a with order n is also a Wieferich prime to base a with order m for all 2 ≤ m ≤ n, and Wieferich prime to base a with order 2 is equivalent to Wieferich prime to base a, so we can only consider the n ≥ 3 case. However, there are no known Wieferich prime to base 2 with order 3. The first base with known Wieferich prime with order 3 is 9, where 2 is a Wieferich prime to base 9 with order 3. Besides, both 5 and 113 are Wieferich prime to base 68 with order 3.

Lucas–Wieferich primes 
Let P and Q be integers. The Lucas sequence of the first kind associated with the pair (P, Q) is defined by

for all . A Lucas–Wieferich prime associated with (P, Q) is a prime p such that Up−ε(P, Q) ≡ 0 (mod p2), where ε equals the Legendre symbol . All Wieferich primes are Lucas–Wieferich primes associated with the pair (3, 2).

Fibonacci–Wieferich primes 
Let Q = −1. For every natural number P, the Lucas–Wieferich primes associated with (P, −1) are called P-Fibonacci–Wieferich primes or P-Wall–Sun–Sun primes. If P = 1, they are called Fibonacci–Wieferich primes. If P = 2, they are called Pell–Wieferich primes.

For example, 241 is a Lucas–Wieferich prime associated with (3, −1), so it is a 3-Fibonacci–Wieferich prime or 3-Wall–Sun–Sun prime. In fact, 3 is a P-Fibonacci–Wieferich prime if and only if P congruent to 0, 4, or 5 (mod 9), which is analogous to the statement for traditional Wieferich primes that 3 is a base-n Wieferich prime if and only if n congruent to 1 or 8 (mod 9).

Wieferich places 
Let K be a global field, i.e. a number field or a function field in one variable over a finite field and let E be an elliptic curve. If v is a non-archimedean place of norm qv of K and a ∈ K, with v(a) = 0 then  ≥ 1. v is called a Wieferich place for base a, if  > 1, an elliptic Wieferich place for base P ∈ E, if NvP ∈ E2 and a strong elliptic Wieferich place for base P ∈ E if nvP ∈ E2, where nv is the order of P modulo v and Nv gives the number of rational points (over the residue field of v) of the reduction of E at v.

See also 
 Wall–Sun–Sun prime – another type of prime number which in the broadest sense also resulted from the study of FLT
 Wolstenholme prime – another type of prime number which in the broadest sense also resulted from the study of FLT
 Wilson prime
 Table of congruences – lists other congruences satisfied by prime numbers
 PrimeGrid – primes search project
BOINC
Distributed computing

References

Further reading

External links 
 
 Fermat-/Euler-quotients  with arbitrary k
 A note on the two known Wieferich primes
 PrimeGrid's Wieferich Prime Search project page

Classes of prime numbers
Unsolved problems in number theory